Hyka is an Albanian and Czech surname. Their origins are unrelated. The Czech feminine form is Hyková.

Notable people with the surname include:
 Jahmir Hyka (born 1988), Albanian footballer
 Klejdi Hyka (born 1997), Albanian footballer
 Lenka Hyková (born 1985), Czech sport shooter, daughter of Vladimír
 Skënder Hyka (1944–2018), Albanian footballer
 Tomáš Hyka (born 1993), Czech ice hockey player
 Vladimír Hyka (born 1952), Czech sport shooter

See also
 

Albanian-language surnames
Czech-language surnames